Leigh and Bransford are two separate civil parishes in the district of Malvern Hills of the county of Worcestershire, England, with a single parish council.

External links 
 Parish Council website
 British History online:Leigh with Bransford
 Office for National Statistics:Leigh CP (parish)
 Office for National Statistics:Bransford CP (Parish)

Geography of Worcestershire
Malvern Hills District